Hypnospace Outlaw is a 2019 simulation video game developed by Tendershoot and published by No More Robots. Set in an alternate history 1999, the game takes place inside a parody of the early Internet and its culture that users visit in their sleep called Hypnospace. The player assumes the role of an "Enforcer" for the fictional company Merchantsoft—creator of Hypnospace—and seeks to police illegal content, copyright violations, viruses, and cyberbullying by users on the service. In the process, the player engages in detective work and puzzle-solving. It was released for Windows, macOS, and Linux in March 2019 and for Nintendo Switch, PlayStation 4, and Xbox One in August 2020.

Gameplay
Hypnospace Outlaw utilizes an interface based on that of a typical graphical interface for a desktop operating system, similar to the likes of Windows 9x, with the player using a fictional in-game "web browser" called Hypnospace Explorer, akin to the massively popular Internet Explorer. The mission is to discover and report objectionable content they have been assigned to investigate by Hypnospace staff. Investigation of cases requires exploration of web pages and searching, aided by hints given by the content of the pages. HypnoCoin, the game's main currency is earned by reporting and closing assigned cases. This currency is exchanged for various downloadable programs, virtual pets, wallpapers, themes, and content that advance the story. It also parodies popular bands during 1999, with many webpages music originating from in-game bands such as "Seepage", "Fre3zer", and the "Chowder Man".

Development
Hypnospace Outlaw was designed by Jay Tholen, creator of the earlier game Dropsy. The new game was funded via a successful Kickstarter campaign, and was a finalist for the Independent Game Festival's 2019 Seumas McNally Grand Prize and "Excellence in Audio". It was released for Windows, macOS, and Linux on March 12, 2019, and for Nintendo Switch, PlayStation 4, and Xbox One on August 27, 2020. A free content update was released for the PC versions alongside the console releases.

Reception 
The game received "generally positive reviews" according to review aggregator Metacritic. It was nominated for the Tin Pan Alley Award for Best Music in a Game, the Statue of Liberty Award for Best World, and the Herman Melville Award for Best Writing at the New York Game Awards. According to PC Gamer, the game is reminiscent of when the internet was more like a cool underground club than a widespread hell from which there is no escape. Both The Gamer and Eurogamer mention the sense of nostalgia that this game brings.

Sequels
A sequel, Dreamsettler, and a spinoff first-person shooter, Slayers X: Terminal Aftermath: Vengance of the Slayer, were both announced in 2022.

References

External links

2019 video games
Alternate history video games
Internet-based works
Kickstarter-funded video games
Linux games
MacOS games
Mass media about Internet culture
Nintendo Switch games
No More Robots games
Parody video games
PlayStation 4 games
Point-and-click adventure games
Retro-style video games
Single-player video games
Video games about dreams
Video games about virtual reality
Video games developed in the United States
Video games set in 1999
Windows games
Xbox Cloud Gaming games
Xbox One games